Asbury is an unincorporated community in Greenbrier County, West Virginia, United States. Asbury is located on West Virginia Route 12, northeast of Alderson. Asbury has a post office with ZIP code 24916.

The community is named for Francis Asbury.

References

Unincorporated communities in Greenbrier County, West Virginia
Unincorporated communities in West Virginia